Meet Me at the Go-Go is a compilation album originally released on July 7, 2003. The compilation consist of eleven previously released songs by prominent Washington, D.C.-based go-go bands. The album was compiled by Snowboy.

Track listing

See also
Go-Go Crankin', 1985 compilation album

References

External links
Meet Me at the Go-Go at Discogs

2003 compilation albums
Go-go albums
Sanctuary Records compilation albums